

The Lioré et Olivier LeO 12 was a night bomber built in France in 1924.

Design and development
The Lioré et Olivier LeO 12 was a large biplane of conventional design, with three-bay equal-span wings and twin engines mounted in nacelles on struts in the interplane gap. The independent main undercarriage units were faired in long, trouser-style spats. Construction throughout was mainly duralumin, skinned in fabric. The pilot's cockpit was open, and there was a second cockpit amidships for a gunner.

Operational history
When the French Air Force was not interested in the type, three of the four examples built were modified for other roles. One became a 12-seat passenger transport that Lioré et Olivier operated on an airline subsidiary, another had its cockpit and gunner's hatch enclosed and was used by the French air ministry as an experimental testbed, and the third received new engines and better defensive armament and was again demonstrated to the army. The reception to this type, the LeO 122, was barely more enthusiastic, but Lioré et Olivier used it as the basis for further development work that would result in the successful LeO 20.

Variants
 LeO 12 - prototype night bomber version with Lorraine-Dietrich 12Db engines (4 built)
 LeO 12 BN.2
 LeO 12 BN.3
 LeO 121 - 12-seat airliner (1 converted from LeO 12)
 LeO 122 - improved night bomber prototype with Gnome-Rhône 9Ab engines and extended "balcony" on nose for second gunner (1 converted from LeO 12)
 LeO 123 - testbed with enclosed cockpits (1 converted from LeO 12)

Specifications (LeO 12)

References

Notes

Bibliography

 Taylor, John W. R. and Jean Alexander. Combat Aircraft of the World. New York: G.P. Putnam's Sons, 1969. . 
 Taylor, Michael J. H. Jane's Encyclopedia of Aviation. London: Studio Editions, 1989. .

External links

 aviafrance.com
 Уголок неба

1920s French bomber aircraft
12
Biplanes
Twin piston-engined tractor aircraft
Aircraft first flown in 1924